Ypthima nikaea, the  Moore's fivering, is a species of Satyrinae butterfly found in Asia.

References

nikaea
Butterflies of Asia
Butterflies described in 1875